Nazarbayev is a Turkic surname.

Nazarbayev may also refer to:

 Nursultan Nazarbayev, 1st President of Kazakhstan

 Nazarbayev University, university in Nur-Sultan
 Nazarbayev Center, public institution in Kazakhstan
 Nursultan Nazarbayev International Airport
 Nazarbayev University Repository, institutional online archive